Youmzain (foaled February 20, 2003 in Ireland) is a Thoroughbred racehorse. Trained by Mick Channon, he won Preis von Europa and Grand Prix de Saint-Cloud group 1 races in 2008. Most notably, he is three-time runner-up in Prix de l'Arc de Triomphe; in 2007 behind Dylan Thomas, in 2008 behind Zarkava, and in 2009 behind Sea The Stars.

Stud record
In his second season at stud, Youmzain sired the Chesham Stakes winner Suits You.

References 
Youmzain racingpost.com racing stats
pedigree and partial racing stats

External links
 Career 1-2-3 Colour Chart – Youmzain

2003 racehorse births
Racehorses bred in Ireland
Racehorses trained in the United Kingdom
Thoroughbred family 11